Mário Trindade (born 25 May 1975) is a Portuguese Paralympic athlete who competes in 100 metres and 400 metres events. He is a European champion and he has competed at the 2016 Summer Paralympics. Trindade is also a Guinness World Records holder for completing the greatest distance covered by a wheelchair in 24 hours, he travelled 183.4km at the Vila Real Stadium in his hometown.

References

1975 births
Living people
Paralympic athletes of Portugal
Medalists at the World Para Athletics European Championships
Athletes (track and field) at the 2016 Summer Paralympics